Life Is a Grave & I Dig It! is the seventh studio album by the psychobilly band the Nekromantix, released in 2007 by Hellcat Records. It is the group's only album to include guitarist Tröy Deströy and drummer Andy DeMize, replacing brothers Peter and Kristian Sandorff who had left the band in 2005 after frontman Kim Nekroman's relocation to Los Angeles, California from the band's home country of Denmark. Seven months after the album's release Deströy left the band to focus on a solo career and was replaced by guitarist Pete Belair of the Australian band Firebird. In January 2009 Martinez was killed in an automobile accident. He was replaced by Lux, formerly of Mystery Hangup and Sacred Storm.

The cd version of the album contains a fourteenth track which is unlisted on the album sleeve, an instrumental version of "Anaheim After Dark."

Track listing
All songs written by Gaarde/Russel/Martinez
"NekroHigh"
"Horny in a Hearse"
"Life Is a Grave & I Dig It!"
"My Girl"
"Rot In Hell!"
"Voodoo Shop Hop"
"Cave Canem"
"Flowers Are Slow"
"B.E.A.S.T."
"Anaheim After Dark"
"Fantazma"
"Panic at the Morgue"
"Out Comes the Batz"
"Anaheim After Dark (instrumental)"

Performers
Kim Nekroman - double bass, lead vocals
Tröy Deströy (Troy Russel) - guitar, backing vocals
Andy DeMize (Andrew Martinez) - drums, backing vocals

Album information
Record label: Hellcat Records
Recorded "In Hell" Studios in Los Angeles, California in 2006. Drums recorded at Thee Warehouse in Los Angeles.
Engineered and mixed by Henrik Neidemeier
Mastered by Jeff King at Threshold Sound
Produced by Kim Nekroman
Front cover photo by Den Labre Larvve Og Papa Razzi
Back cover photo by Matt Ginsberg
Artwork and layout by Kim Nekroman

References

Nekromantix albums
2007 albums